Onara may refer to:
 Onara, Tombolo, Italy
 "Onara" (song), the theme song of the South Korean television drama Dae Jang Geum
 Onara (book), a Japanese children's book published in 1978
 Onara Peninsula, a peninsula to the east of Luzhin Bay in Magadan Oblast, Russia
 Ōnara Stop, former name of Tatsuokajō Station, a train station in Saku, Nagano, Japan
 Onara, a fictional continent in the Dungeons & Dragons campaign setting Arcanis

See also
Oh Na-ra (born 1977), South Korean actress